Josh Azzarella (born 1978, Ohio) is an artist based in New York, New York.

Education 
BFA, Myers School of Art, The University of Akron
MFA, Mason Gross School of the Arts, Rutgers University

Photography 

Azzarella's work reflects on moments in history such as the torture of Iraqi POWs in Abu Ghraib and the protest of a single man in Tienanmen Square against a column of tanks. Azzarella reworks these canonical images to omit the tragic, negative, or most disturbing aspect of these images. For example, a photograph of a smiling Lynndie England pointing to a prisoner forced to masturbate is altered to only contain the smiling soldier.

Video 
In 2011 Azzarella released Untitled #125 (Hickory), one of the longest-running experimental films at 120 hours. Untitled #125 (Hickory) is an art work created between 2009–2011. The work is based upon the 6 minute and 30-second section in the film The Wizard of Oz, from the moment the viewer sees the tornado until Dorothy meets Glinda the Good Witch. This work extends a moment of transformative transition (Dorothy's journey to Oz) to envelop what the artist believes is the entire time of her experience.

The parenthetical reference refers to a deleted scene from the film where the farmhand, Hickory, is working on a machine to ward off tornados.

In 2022 Azzarella released Untitled #175 (... hitting an all time low...) in the exhibition Triple Feature at the City Gallery Wellington, in Wellington, New Zealand. In the work Azzarella has removed all human, and animal, presence from Stanley Kubrick's 2001: A Space Odyssey.

Controversy 
In 2008 Azzarella was scheduled to be included in the exhibition The Aesthetics of Terror at the Chelsea Art Museum in New York City. The exhibition was cancelled by the museum. Azzarella's work was identified as part of the reason for cancellation as reported by Fox News. The museum board and director chose to cancel the exhibition as they felt "some of the works in the exhibition glorified terrorism".

Museum exhibitions 
The Aldrich Museum of Contemporary Art, CT.
The Akron Art Museum, OH.
San Jose Museum of Art, CA.
Indianapolis Museum of Contemporary Art, IN.
Zimmerli Museum of Fine Art at Rutgers University, NJ.
Montclair Art Museum, NJ.
Torrence Art Museum, CA.
UNLV Barrick Museum of Art, NV.
University Museum California State Long Beach, CA.

References 

 FOX News.com  – New York Museum Cancels Terror Exhibition After Controversy 
 The Brooklyn Rail  – Josh Azzarella and Fresh Kills 
 The New Yorker – Short List 
 Interview with the Artist

External links 
Artist website

Fox News article on The Aesthetics of Terror exhibition.

1978 births
Living people
Artists from Akron, Ohio
American photographers
American video artists
Date of birth missing (living people)